Beginnings: Greatest Hits & New Songs is the fifteenth solo studio album by Cilla Black. The project features eleven all-new studio recordings produced by Ted Carfrae alongside nine of Black's own hit singles produced by George Martin. Also included as a hidden track is a club remix of a re-recording of "Step Inside Love", produced by DJ Tommy Sandhu (which had been a No. 3 UK Club Hit).

The album was a minor hit in the UK charts, peaking at No. 68, and staying in the top 75 for one week.

Track listing 
 "Anyone Who Had a Heart" [2003 Remaster] (Burt Bacharach, Hal David) – 2:51
 "Kiss You All Over" (Mike Chapman, Nicky Chinn) – 4:03
 "Step Inside Love" [2003 Remaster] (John Lennon, Paul McCartney) – 2:22
 "If You Could Read My Mind" (Gordon Lightfoot) – 3:39
 "Beginnings" (Burt Bacharach, Hal David) – 3:53
 "Beautiful Goodbye" (Jennifer Hanson, Kim Patton Johnston) – 4:11
 "Surround Yourself with Sorrow" [2003 Remaster] (Bill Martin, Phil Coulter) – 2:37
 "Imagine" (with Cliff Richard) (John Lennon, Yoko Ono) – 3:39
 "Let There Be Love" (Ian Grant, Lionel Rand) – 2:30
 "Conversations" [2003 Remaster] (Jerry Lordan, Roger Cook, Roger Greenaway) – 4:10
 "It's for You" [2003 Remaster] (John Lennon, Paul McCartney) – 2:21
 "This Kiss" (with Cliff Richard) (Beth Nielsen Chapman, Robin Lerner, Annie Roboff) – 3:17
 "My Man (You've Changed My Tune)" (Cynthia Webb, Vini Poncia) – 3:30
 "Alfie" [2003 Remaster] (Burt Bacharach, Hal David) – 2:39
 "Something Tells Me (Something's Gonna Happen Tonight)" [2003 Remaster] (Roger Greenaway, Roger Cook) – 2:28
 "Photograph" (with Cliff Richard) (Richard Starkey, George Harrison) – 3:51
 "I've Been Wrong Before" (2003 version) (Randy Newman) – 3:41
 "You've Lost That Lovin' Feelin'" [2003 Remaster] (Phil Spector, Barry Mann, Cynthia Weil) – 3:09
 "You're My World" [2003 Remaster] (Umberto Bindi, Gino Paoli, Carl Sigman) – 2:57
 "Anyone Who Had a Heart" (Late Night version) [Re-Recording] (Burt Bacharach, Hal David) – 9:37
 "Step Inside Love" (All Burnt Out Mix) [Re-Recording] (Hidden Track) (John Lennon, Paul McCartney) – 4:31

Re-release 
The album was released on digital download in 2008 shortly after the CD was deleted.

On 3 August 2009, EMI Records released a repackaged edition of the album exclusively to digital download. This re-issue entitled Beginnings: Revisited excludes all the hit singles which are otherwise available and presents solely the 2003 recordings with many previously unreleased bonus tracks. A digital booklet containing all-new cover album artwork, detailed track information was available from iTunes with purchases of the entire album re-issue.

Track listing 
 "Kiss You All Over" [2009 Mix] (Mike Chapman, Nicky Chinn) – 4:17
 "Imagine" (backing vocals by Cliff Richard) [2009 Mix] (John Lennon, Yoko Ono) – 3:39
 "Beautiful Goodbye" [2009 Mix - Full Version] (Jennifer Hanson, Kim Patton Johnston) – 4:34
 "Let There Be Love" [2009 Mix] (Ian Grant, Lionel Rand) – 2:29
 "Beginnings" [2009 Mix] (Burt Bacharach, Hal David) – 3:56
 "This Kiss" [2009 Mix - Extended Version] (Beth Nielsen Chapman, Robin Lerner, Annie Roboff) – 3:34
 "My Man (You've Changed My Tune)" [2009 Mix] (Cynthia Webb, Vini Poncia) – 3:32
 "If You Could Read My Mind" [2009 Mix] (Gordon Lightfoot) – 3:35
 "I've Been Wrong Before" [2009 Mix] (Randy Newman) – 3:40
 "Photograph" [2009 Mix] (Richard Starkey, George Harrison) – 3:54
 "Anyone Who Had a Heart" [Late Night Version - 2009 Mix] (Burt Bacharach, Hal David) – 4:50
 "Step Inside Love" [All Burnt Out Mix] (John Lennon, Paul McCartney) – 4:31
 "Kiss You All Over" [2009 Acoustic Mix] (Mike Chapman, Nicky Chinn) – 4:09
 "Imagine" [2009 Acoustic Mix] (John Lennon, Yoko Ono) – 3:24
 "Beautiful Goodbye" [2009 Klubkidz Remix - Radio Edit] (Jennifer Hanson, Kim Patton Johnston) – 3:58
 "Imagine" [2009 Orchestral Mix] (John Lennon, Yoko Ono) – 3:27
 "My Man (You've Changed My Tune)" [2009 Alternate Mix] (Cynthia Webb, Vini Poncia) – 3:32
 "Beautiful Goodbye" [2009 Stripped Down Mix] (Jennifer Hanson, Kim Patton Johnston) – 3:53

Personnel 
 Lead vocals by Cilla Black
 Produced by Ted Carfrae (tracks: 2, 4, 5, 6, 8, 9, 12, 13, 16, 17, 20 on Beginnings: Greatest Hits and New Songs, all tracks on Beginnings: Revisited)
 Produced by George Martin (tracks: 1, 3, 7, 10, 11, 14, 15, 18, 19 on Beginnings: Greatest Hits and New Songs)
 Produced by DJ Tommy Sandhu (track 21 on Beginnings: Greatest Hits and New Songs)
 Album cover photograph by Nicky Johnston

References

Further reading

External links 
 Cilla Black - Beginnings: Greatest Hits and New Songs (2003) album review by Bruce Eder, credits & releases at AllMusic
 Cilla Black - Beginnings: Greatest Hits and New Songs (2003) album releases & credits at Discogs
 Cilla Black - Beginnings: Greatest Hits and New Songs (2003) album to be listened as stream on Spotify
 Cilla Black - All Mixed Up (2009) / Beginnings: Revisited (2009) (2CD released in 2018) album releases & credits at Discogs
 Cilla Black - Beginnings Revisited (2009) album to be listened as stream on Spotify

2003 albums
2009 albums
2003 compilation albums
Cilla Black albums
EMI Records albums